Rolf Olsen (13 February 1818 – 7 June 1864) was a Norwegian politician and playwright.

Biography
Rolf Olsen was born in Bergen, Norway. He was the son of  Andreas Schram Olsen (1791–1841), the bailiff (byfogd) of Bergen. He was a student in Skien and earned a Candidatus juris in 1842. In 1846, he was employed as a clerk in the Interior Ministry and was in this position until 1852. He  also worked as a journalist, especially for Morgenbladet, where he was editor from 1848. Between 1840 and 1850, he wrote several plays including both tragedies and comedies.

He was elected to the Norwegian Parliament in 1854, 1857, 1859 and 1862, representing the constituency of Østerrisøer in Nedenes county, Norway. In 1863 he was appointed judge in Gauldalen, but died the following year.

Selected works
 Den sidste viking (1840)
 Salonen eller Intrigen i Kræmmerhuset (1848)
 Kontrolløren, eller Eventyr paa Landet (1849)
 Tolvte ordentlige Storting (1850)

References

1818 births
1864 deaths
Norwegian jurists
Members of the Storting
Aust-Agder politicians
People from Risør
19th-century Norwegian writers
19th-century Norwegian dramatists and playwrights
Norwegian male dramatists and playwrights